Ulan was a Kazakh UCI Continental cycling team. It competed only for the 2008 season.

2008 roster

Major wins
2008
Stage 2 Tour du Loir-et-Cher, Valentin Iglinskiy
Stage 4 Five Rings of Moscow, Simas Kondrotas
Stages 3 & 6 Vuelta a Navarra, Valentin Iglinskiy
Stage 4 Dookoła Mazowsza, Linas Balčiūnas

References

Defunct cycling teams based in Kazakhstan
Cycling teams based in Kazakhstan
Cycling teams established in 2008
Cycling teams disestablished in 2008
UCI Continental Teams (Europe)